Rot is a 2019 horror drama film directed by Andrew Merrill and starring Kris Alexandre.

Plot 
After bookworm, Madison breaks up with her boyfriend Jesse (Johnny Kostrey) due to them having different life paths and her studies being more important than anything else. Later in the story, Jesse gets infected by a rare rage virus from an elderly woman while in the process of trying to propose to Madison. After the infection runs its course, rage takes over Jesse' body, turning him into a nightmare from hell.

Cast

Production 

The story was inspired by and compared to the films of director David Cronenberg.

The film was:
 Written, directed, and film edited by Andrew Merrill.
 Produced by Beth Crudele and the Executive producer was Andrew Merrill.
 The cinematographer was Bogdan Yansen.
 Original music by Josy Svajda.
 Production design was created by Stephanie Ottinger.
 Costume design was by Pamela Wilkinson.

Release 
Rot was screened at the 16th annual - Another Hole in the Head Film Fest of December 2019 at New People Cinema in San Francisco. Around the year 2020 the film received a distribution deal with The Horror Collective.

The film was released via genre distributor The Horror Collective on November 19, 2020 exclusively through Amazon.

On July 20, 2021, the film was released on horror-genre Shudder platform.

Reception 
According to Deadline,“The Horror Collective’s mission is to uplift new and exciting voices, to help create the next generation of horror masters,” said Shaked Berenson, CEO of The Horror Collective parent company Entertainment Squad. “Rot is one of those movies that is a perfect example of the kind of people and content we want to work with and we’re proud to add to our slate.”

Terry Mesnard of Gayly Dreadful! wrote,"This is all interesting and well-done. Merrill created sympathetic characters and we spend a lot of time with them, building their relationships. Even the side characters like Aaron (Johnny Uhorchuk) and Nora (Sara Young Chandler) are given more depth than you’d expect. They also provide an interesting foil to Madison and Jesse, with their burgeoning relationship contrasting with Madison/Jesse’s rapidly deteriorating one."

References 

2019 drama films
2019 horror films
2019 independent films
2010s English-language films
2010s satirical films
Films set in Los Angeles
American romance films
Films shot in California
American independent films
2010s American films